Trenton City Hall is located in Trenton, Mercer County, New Jersey, United States. The white marble building was built in 1907 and added to the National Register of Historic Places on January 30, 1978.  The building contains murals by American painter Everett Shinn.

See also
National Register of Historic Places listings in Mercer County, New Jersey

References

Buildings and structures in Trenton, New Jersey
City and town halls in New Jersey
Government buildings completed in 1907
City and town halls on the National Register of Historic Places in New Jersey
Renaissance Revival architecture in New Jersey
National Register of Historic Places in Trenton, New Jersey
New Jersey Register of Historic Places